3,8-Dihydrodiligustilide is a nonsteroidal phytoprogestogen that is found in Ligusticum chuanxiong. It is a potent agonist of the progesterone receptor (EC50 = 90 nM). Another compound in the plant, riligustilide, is also a phytoprogestogen, but is almost 1,000-fold less potent and is very weak in comparison (EC50 ≈ 81 μM).

See also
 Kaempferol
 Tanaproget

References

Progestogens